Abbottabad is a city in Khyber Pakhtunkhwa, Pakistan.

Abbottabad may also refer to:

Abbottabad Tehsil,  administrative subdivision (tehsil) of Abbottabad District, Khyber Pakhtunkhwa, Pakistan
Abbottabad District, district in Khyber Pakhtunkhwa, Pakistan
Abbottabad (poem), by Major James Abbott